In systems analysis, a one-to-many relationship is a type of cardinality that refers to the relationship between two entities (see also entity–relationship model) A and B in which an element of A may be linked to many elements of B, but a member of B is linked to only one element of A. For instance, think of A as books, and B as pages. A book can have many pages, but a page can only be in one book.

In a relational database, a one-to-many relationship exists when one row in table A may be linked with many rows in table B, but one row in table B is linked to only one row in table A. It is important to note that a one-to-many relationship is not a property of the data, but rather of the relationship itself. A list of authors and their books may happen to describe books with only one author, in which case one row of the books table will refer to only one row of the authors table, but the relationship itself is not one-to-many, because books may have more than one author, forming a many-to-many relationship.

The opposite of one-to-many is many-to-one. The transpose of a one-to-many relationship is a many-to-one relationship.

Entity relationship diagram (ERD) notations 
One notation as described in Entity Relationship modeling is Chen notation or formally Chen ERD notation created originally by Peter Chen in 1976 where a one-to-many relationship is notated as 1:N where N represents the cardinality and can be 0 or higher.
A many-to-one relationship is sometimes notated as N:1.

See also 
 One-to-one (data model)
 Many-to-many (data model)

References

Data modeling